Raichberg transmitter is a broadcast facility for various FM radio and television programs operated by the Südwestrundfunk (SWR, "Southwest Broadcasting") on the Raichberg mountain (elevation ) in Albstadt, Baden-Württemberg, Germany. It uses a 137 meter (449 ft) guyed steel tube mast as the antenna tower. There is also a free-standing lattice tower for microwave radio.

History
The first transmitting antenna was installed at this time on the observation tower “Raichbergturm”, which is close to the current station.

See also
List of masts

External links
 
 

Radio in Germany
Radio masts and towers in Germany
Albstadt